Keith Alexander is an Australian former actor, best known for work on British television.

Alexander's television credits include Softly, Softly (1966), The New Avengers (1976), Minder (1979) and The Day of the Triffids (1981). On the big screen, he has had roles in Submarine X-1 (1968), Superman (1978), Hanover Street (1979) and All About a Prima Ballerina (1980).

He has also featured in some of the productions of Gerry Anderson. In addition to voicing the character of John Tracy in the 1968 film Thunderbird 6 (also serving as the film's narrator), Alexander voiced Sam Loover and numerous supporting characters in the television series Joe 90 (1968–69). His other Anderson appearances are in the 1969 film Doppelgänger, The Secret Service (1969), and as the SHADO HQ radio operator in the television series UFO (1970, as Lt. Keith Ford).

Filmography

External links

British male film actors
Place of birth missing (living people)
Year of birth missing (living people)
British male television actors
British male voice actors
Living people